Periscepsia carbonaria is a species of fly in the family Tachinidae.

Distribution
Austria, Belgium, Bosnia and Herzegovina, Bulgaria, Corsica, Czech Republic, Denmark, Finland, France, Germany, Greece, Hungary, Italy, Latvia, Moldova, Netherlands, North Macedonia, Poland, Portugal, Romania, Russia, Sicily, Slovakia, Spain, Sweden, Switzerland, Ukraine, United Kingdom and Yugoslavia

References

Diptera of Europe
Dexiinae
Taxa named by Georg Wolfgang Franz Panzer
Insects described in 1798